Bhuvanagiri is a Taluka in the Cuddalore district of the Indian state of Tamil Nadu. It is the birthplace of a South Indian saint, Sri Raghavendra Swami and is close to Maruthur, the birthplace of Saint Ramalinga Adigalar.

The word Bhuvanagiri is a combination of Bhuvanam (meaning World) and Giri (meaning Mountain). Hence, the name Bhuvanagiri means "The place with a mountain."

Geography 
It has an average elevation of 11 meters (36 feet). It is located seven kilometres (4.35 miles) away from the temple town, Chidambaram.

The River Vellaru (a tributary of River Cauvery) is the main source of water for irrigation and other purposes.

Demographics 
 India census, Bhuvanagiri had a population of 20,656 with a 50-50 male and female ratio. Bhuvanagiri has an average literacy rate of 71%, higher than the national average of 59.5%; with male literacy of 79% and female literacy of 64%. 12% of the population is under 6 years of age.

Hindus, Muslims, and Christians are the main religions followed by the people here.

Politics
Bhuvanagiri, a legislative assembly constituency is part of Chidambaram (Lok Sabha constituency).

Economy 

Agriculture is the main occupation of more than three-quarters of the town's population. Rice is the most cultivated crop, followed by the black gram and green gram. These crops are cultivated in a type of land known in Tamil as NanSei (meaning wetland cultivation). Other minor crops like finger Millet (Ragi in Tamil), pearl millet (Kambu in Tamil), corn (Makkaa cholam in Tamil), Thoor dhal (Thuvaram parupu in Tamil), sesame seeds (Yel in Tamil) and red gram are also grown around this town. These sets of crops are cultivated in a type of land known in Tamil as PunSei.

The principal exports from Bhuvanagiri are silk and handloom cloths. It is also known for its Silk saris and Silk Textiles, which are referred to as "Bhuvanagiri Pattu".

Transport
A road bridge over the River Vellaru in Bhuvanagiri, connects the roadway between Cuddalore and Chidambaram.

Education 

Bhuvanagiri has several educational centres. There are two gender-exclusive government higher secondary schools. There are also private higher secondary schools and nursery schools.

Kamarajar Polytechnic College and Annamalai University are located near Bhuvanagiri.

References 

Cities and towns in Cuddalore district